Ludvig Drescher (21 July 1881 in Sønderborg – 14 July 1917 in Copenhagen) was a Danish amateur footballer in the goalkeeper position. He played four games for the Denmark national football team, and won a silver medal at the 1908 Summer Olympics. He played his entire senior career with Kjøbenhavns Boldklub, with whom he won the 1913 Danish football championship.

Drescher took part in the first official Danish national team game, played at the 1908 Summer Olympics. He was the starting goalkeeper in all three Danish games at the 1908 Olympic football tournament, as Denmark won silver medals. He played his fourth and last Danish national team game in May 1910. Drescher was once again selected for the Danish squad at the 1912 Summer Olympics. He was an unused reserve player throughout the games, and did not receive a medal, as Denmark won silver again in the 1912 Olympic football tournament.

References

External links
Danish national team profile
DatabaseOlympics profile

1881 births
1917 deaths
Association football goalkeepers
Danish men's footballers
Kjøbenhavns Boldklub players
Denmark international footballers
Olympic footballers of Denmark
Footballers at the 1908 Summer Olympics
Footballers at the 1912 Summer Olympics
Olympic silver medalists for Denmark
People from Sønderborg Municipality
Olympic medalists in football
Medalists at the 1908 Summer Olympics
Sportspeople from the Region of Southern Denmark